Fuzzbubble was an American rock/power pop band from Long Island, New York, active from 1995 to 2001. It consisted of Jim Bacchi on guitar, Mark DiCarlo on vocals, Jason Camiolo on drums, and Brett Rothfeld on bass. They were signed by  Sean "Puffy" Combs' Bad Boy Records. In 1997, they contributed to a rock remix of Puff Daddy's song "It's All About the Benjamins". A year later, their track "Out There" appeared on the soundtrack to the film Godzilla, and they performed on the song "Nowhere to Run (Vapor Trail)" from the soundtrack to South Park, after which they left Bad Boy Records. During their career, the group released two albums: Fuzzbubble (2000) and Demos, Outtakes and Rarities (2002). Their self-titled debut was produced by Mike Clink and featured guest appearances from the Bangles' Susanna Hoffs, and Roger Joseph Manning Jr. from Jellyfish.

Band members
 Mark DiCarlo – vocals
 Jim Bacchi – guitar
 Brett Rothfeld – bass
 Jason Camiolo – drums

Discography
 Fuzzbubble (2000)
 Demos, Outtakes and Rarities (2002)

References

American power pop groups
Bad Boy Records artists
Musical groups from Long Island